Gunnhild Eide Sundli (born 2 July 1985) is a Norwegian musical artist. She was born and raised in Orkdal, Norway and now resides in Trondheim.

Career 
Sundli started to "kvede" (a traditional Norwegian singing tradition) as a nine-year-old, and has since also been singing classical and jazz. She studied "kveding" at Heimdal videregående skole (high school).

Sundli is best known as the singer of the band Gåte from 1999 until the band took a break in 2005.  In 2017 Gåte returned with a new EP and a full length album in 2019.  They are currently working on producing a "Best of" album, with a new album in late 2021.

In February 2006 she started her acting career with her debut in the cabaret Cafe Isogaisa by Hans Rotmo, and continued in June in the role as Anna in Korsvikaspillet in Trondheim. In August she played Lucie in the opera about Olav Engelbrektsson on Steinvikholmen, before she participated in the historical play Raud Vinter in Levanger in September. In 2007 she acted in Ibsen's Villanden, at Trøndelag Teater, and she also played the main character Maren in the historical play Maren Dømt til Døden on Hitra the same year.

Sundli released her debut solo album Tankerop in 2013.

Discography

Solo albums 
2013: Tankerop (EMI)

Collaborations 

Within Gåte
2000: Gåte
2002: Jygri (Warner Elektra Atlantic)
2003: Statt opp (Maggeduliadei)
2004: Iselilja (Warner Elektra Atlantic)
2006: Liva (Warner Elektra Atlantic), live
2017: Attersyn
2019: Svevn

With Aasmund Nordstoga
2015: Sæle Jolekveld

References

External links 
Gunnhild Sundli - Du e nær (official music video) on YouTube
Interview in Avisa Sør-Trøndelag 07.09.2005 
Interview in VG 07.09.2005
Interview in Adresseavisen 08.10.2005 
Interview in Verdalingen 09.01.2006
Interview in Byavisa i Trondheim 07.02.2006
Netmeeting with Gunnhild Sundli at adressa.no 22.02.2006

1985 births
Living people
Norwegian film actresses
Norwegian stage actresses
People from Sør-Trøndelag
21st-century Norwegian singers
21st-century Norwegian women singers